Khan Baba Kandi (also Romanized as Khān Bābā Kandī) is a village in Qeshlaq-e Sharqi Rural District, Qeshlaq Dasht District, Bileh Savar County, Ardabil Province, Iran. At the 2006 census, its population was 905, in 181 families.

References 

Towns and villages in Bileh Savar County